The 7th Parliament of the Province of Canada was summoned in July 1861, following the general election for the Legislative Assembly in June 1861.  It first met on July 15, 1861, and was dissolved in May 1863.

This was the first election in the Province of Canada to use a list of eligible voters prepared before the election. All sessions were held in Quebec City. The 7th Parliament ended following a vote of no confidence on May 8, 1863.

The Speaker of the Legislative Assembly was Joseph-Édouard Turcotte.

Canada East - 65 Seats

Canada West - 65 Seats

References 

Upper Canadian politics in the 1850s, Underhill (and others), University of Toronto Press (1967)

External links 
 Ontario's parliament buildings ; or, A century of legislation, 1792-1892 : a historical sketch
  Assemblée nationale du Québec (French)

07